Air France Flight 117 was a multi-leg international scheduled flight from Paris-Orly Airport via Lisbon, the Azores, Guadeloupe and Peru to Santiago, Chile, which crashed 22 June 1962. The Boeing 707–328 aircraft involved in the accident was just four months old.

History
The flight was uneventful until approaching Pointe-à-Pitre. The airport is surrounded by mountains and requires a steep descent. The weather was poor – violent thunderstorm and low cloud ceiling. The VOR navigational beacon was out of service. The crew reported themselves over the non-directional beacon (NDB) at 5,000 feet (1,524 m) and turned east to begin the final approach. Due to incorrect automatic direction finder (ADF) readings caused by the thunderstorm, the plane strayed 15 km (9.3 mi) west from the procedural let-down track. The plane crashed in a forest on a hill called Dos D'Ane ("The Donkey's Back"), at about 1,400 feet (427 m) and exploded. There were no survivors. Among the dead were French Guianan politician and war hero Justin Catayée, poet and black-consciousness activist Paul Niger, and Wanda Llosa, first cousin of future Nobel laureate Mario Vargas Llosa.

The investigation could not determine the exact reason for the accident, but suspected the insufficient meteorological information given to the crew, failure of the ground equipment, and the atmospheric effects on the ADF indicator. After the crash Air France pilots criticized under-developed airports with facilities that were ill-equipped to handle jet aircraft, such as Guadeloupe's airport. This was the second accident in less than three weeks with an Air France Boeing 707 after the crash on 3 June 1962. Tex Johnston, Chief Test Pilot of Boeing Aircraft Co. wrote in his autobiography of events leading up to the crash. "Air France flight crews were habitually late (for crew training by Boeing), and on occasion the airplane not serviced. ... After much extra, and in my mind, excessive flight training, the chief pilot failed to qualify." He informed the Air France Chief Executive in writing "I did not believe the captain capable of qualifying in the 707." Later "... an Air France instructor qualified the chief pilot. On his second trip as captain, he missed an inclement weather approach... and crashed into a mountain."

Some debris still remain at the site, where a memorial monument was placed in 2002 to mark the 40th anniversary of the crash. The road leading to the site is named Route du Boeing in memory of the crash.

Air France currently uses this flight number on a Shanghai–Pudong to Paris–Charles de Gaulle flight using a Boeing 777.

Memorials

Monuments
Several commemorative steles were erected at the site of the accident at Dos d'Âne mountain on 22 June 1962, then in 2002 with an official stele of the commune and the region with the list of all the victims.

Songs
 Volé Boeing-la, de  , 1962 (tribute to the victims of which his father died in the crash)

References

Sources
 
 An article about the crash
 Tex Johnston: Jet-Age Test Pilot by A.M. "Tex" Johnston with Charles Barton 

Aviation accidents and incidents in 1962
Aviation accidents and incidents in France
Aviation accidents and incidents in Guadeloupe
117
Accidents and incidents involving the Boeing 707
Airliner accidents and incidents involving controlled flight into terrain
1962 in France
Accidental deaths in Guadeloupe
1962 in Guadeloupe
June 1962 events in North America
1962 disasters in France